Ockje Caroline Tellegen  (born 16 October 1974) is a Dutch politician serving as a member of the House of Representatives since 20 September 2012. A member of the People's Party for Freedom and Democracy (VVD), she has been first Deputy Speaker and president of the committee on Education, Culture and Science since 2017.

Tellegen worked as a policy officer at the Ministry of Foreign Affairs and later was stationed at the Dutch embassy in  Berlin. She then became political assistant to Atzo Nicolaï from 2006 to 2012. Tellegen has been a member of the House of Representatives since 20 September 2012. She has been party secretary of the VVD since October 31, 2017 and is also the first vice-chairman of the House of Representatives.

Tellegen collided with Sylvana Simons during a committee meeting in December 2021. She wanted to point out that fellow PVV MP Harm Beertema made comments outside the microphone that she experienced as intimidating. Tellegen then reprimanded her, after which Simons filed a complaint.

Chamber president Vera Bergkamp defended Tellegen's actions in a letter later.

Tellegen has been on sick leave since March 18, 2022 and was replaced by Chris Simons until July 8.

After the summer recess she was replaced by Martijn Grevink from 23 August.

References 

  Parlement.com biography

1974 births
Living people
Dutch civil servants
Dutch expatriates in Germany
Dutch speechwriters
Members of the House of Representatives (Netherlands)
People from Delft
People's Party for Freedom and Democracy politicians
21st-century Dutch politicians
21st-century Dutch women politicians